Laurence or Lawrence Clark may refer to:

 Laurence Clark (cartoonist) (born 1949), New Zealand cartoonist and illustrator
 Laurence Clark (comedian), British stand-up comedian, presenter and disability rights campaigner
 Lawrence Gordon Clark, English television director and producer

See also 
Larry Clark (disambiguation)
 Lawrence Clarke (disambiguation)